Chamber of Commerce Building is a historic commercial building located at Terre Haute, Vigo County, Indiana, United States. It was built in 1925, and is a two-story, rectangular, Tudor Revival-style brown brick building.  It features limestone detailing, a green tile facade roof, and an arcade of Tudor arches.

It was listed on the National Register of Historic Places in 1983, and was delisted in 2019.

References

Commercial buildings on the National Register of Historic Places in Indiana
Tudor Revival architecture in Indiana
Commercial buildings completed in 1925
Buildings and structures in Terre Haute, Indiana
National Register of Historic Places in Terre Haute, Indiana
Former National Register of Historic Places in Indiana